Bethel Township is located in McDonough County, Illinois. As of the 2010 census, its population was 327 and it contained 148 housing units.

History
The first settler of Bethel Township was John Gibson, a native of the state of North Carolina, who settled in 1829, on section two. He built the first house within the limits of the present township near the village of Middletown.

Among other earliest settlers of Bethel township between 1829 and 1835 were: Benjamin Matthews, James H. Dunsworth, Charles Dunsworth, James Edmonston, John Venard, William Venard, Malachi Monk, John Monk, Martin Fugate, John W. Fugate, James C. Archer, Thomas F. Shoopman, William I. Pace, Bowen Webb, Jesse C. Webb, John Matthews, Samuel T. Matthews, M. C. Foster, William Holton, George W. Provine, James L. Horrell, John McCormack, John Patrick, John E. Riggs, and Samuel Riggs.

Bethel township assumed official organization in 1856, at the time of the division of the county into townships. It was originally known as Eagle township, but was changed to its present cognomen at the first meeting of the board of supervisors in May, 1857. The first township election was held April 7, 1857, at which time William Twaddle and John Taylor were elected the first justices of the peace, and John Brundage, constable.

Geography

Demographics

References

External links
City-data.com
Illinois State Archives

Townships in McDonough County, Illinois
Townships in Illinois
1856 establishments in Illinois
Populated places established in 1856